Woong, also spelled Ung, is a Korean masculine given name and name element. It is one of a small number of single-syllable Korean given names. The meaning differs based on the hanja used to write it. There are only two hanja with this reading on the South Korean government's official list of hanja which may be used in given names, one meaning "hero", and the other meaning "bear". Though the character meaning "bear" is used as a family name in China (Xiong), it is not a traditional Korean family name, and according to the 2000 South Korean census no one in the country had that family name.

People with this given name include:
Kim Ung (1910/1912 – ?), North Korean general
Chang Ung (born 1938), North Korean taekwondo athlete
Namkung Woong (born 1984), South Korean footballer
Byun Woong (born 1986), South Korean footballer
Heo Ung (born 1993), South Korean basketball player

Given names containing this element include:
Jae-woong
Ji-woong
Ki-woong
Tae-woong

See also
List of Korean given names

References

Korean masculine given names